Rivne is the capital of Rivne Oblast, Ukraine.

Rivne may also refer to:

 Rivne Oblast, Ukraine
 Rivne, Lviv Oblast, a village in Lviv Oblast, Ukraine
 Rivne International Airport in Rivne
 RC Rivne, a rugby club in Rivne

See also
 Rovné, Svidník District, a village in Slovakia